The Heinkel HD 42 50, later designated the Heinkel He 42 was a German two-seat biplane seaplane originally designed for the Deutsche Verkehrsfliegerschule, and later built for the German Luftwaffe. The aircraft was used until the end of World War II as a trainer for maritime pilots.

Design and development
In 1929, Heinkel developed a biplane, the HD 42, for use with the covert military-training organization Deutsche Verkehrsfliegerschule (DVS). Its fuselage was constructed out of a welded steel tube truss and had a rectangular cross-section with a rounded top. The engine covers were made out of light-weight metal, while the rest of the fuselage was covered in fabric. The aircraft was equipped with floats.

The HD 42 model received good feedback from the Swedish Navy, who had purchased the aircraft, as well as from the famous pilot Gunther Plüschow (who was the first airman to fly over the Patagonian mountains of Chile and Argentina at Tierra del Fuego). The prototype was equipped with a BMW Va engine, but the later versions came with a Junkers L5G engine.

Ten aircraft had been manufactured by 1932, when a new version, the He 42C was rolled out. Series production began with the He 42D model (14 manufactured) which were intended for the German Air Force, which at the time was illegal. A further 189 He 42Es were built in 1934 and these aircraft were used by various flying schools until the end of World War II

Variants
HD 42Prototype aircraft
He 42C
He 42DFirst series produced model, 14 built
He 42ESecond series produced model, 189 built

Operators

Bulgarian Air Force

Luftwaffe

Swedish Air Force

Royal Romanian Naval Aviation

Specifications (He 42C-2)

See also

References

1930s German military trainer aircraft
Biplanes
He 042
Single-engined tractor aircraft
Aircraft first flown in 1929